Henryk Charucki (born 2 December 1955) is a Polish former racing cyclist. He won the Tour de Pologne 1979.

References

External links

1955 births
Living people
Polish male cyclists
People from Ostrów Mazowiecka
Sportspeople from Masovian Voivodeship